Spraoi (pron. "spree") is a festival of international street theatre and world music which takes place for three days each August in the Irish city of Waterford. The festival takes its name from the Gaelic word spraoi, or play. The Waterford Spraoi has taken place each summer since 1992 and is now the largest festival event in Waterford. The main activity is centred on two main stages located in the John Roberts Square and William Vincent Wallace Plaza where various acts have been hosted including the Royal Drummers of Burundi and the Ukulele Orchestra of Great Britain, as well as  more contemporary bands and musicians.

The Spraoi is a professional event that is also  supported by more than 300 volunteers. The festival attracts audiences of over 80,000 to see events in music, art installations, storytelling, circus skills workshops, science and others.

References

External links
 Official website
 Spraoi in the Park, a smaller Spraoi event held in July

Annual events in Ireland
Arts festivals in the Republic of Ireland
August events
Culture in Waterford (city)
Street theatre
Theatre festivals in Ireland
Music festivals established in 1992
Summer events in the Republic of Ireland